Paul Michael Jones is an American politician. He is currently a Republican member of the Pennsylvania House of Representatives, representing the 93rd District since 2019.

Early life and education
Jones was born in York County, Pennsylvania, and grew up in Dallastown. He graduated from Dallastown Area High School in 1987, and earned a Bachelor of Science degree in electronic engineering technology from DeVry University in 1991.

Business career
In 1994, Jones began working for St. Onge, a supply chain logistics company based in York, Pennsylvania. He was named president of the company in 2006. Jones served as president of St. Onge until his retirement in 2017.

Political career
Jones served briefly served on the board of the Dallastown Area School District, having been elected in 2017, and resigning in 2019. His resignation came after he was elected to the Pennsylvania House of Representatives in 2018, and Jones believed serving on both the school board and in the State House would constitute a conflict of interest.

Jones was first elected to represent the 93rd District in the Pennsylvania House of Representatives in 2018, winning re-election in 2020 and 2022.

In 2020, Jones founded the Economic Growth Caucus, made up of state representatives with backgrounds in business, Jones defined the group's purpose as promoting economic growth. Upon its founding Jones was made chairman of the caucus.

Jones opposed mitigation and lockdown measures imposed by Governor Tom Wolf during the COVID-19 pandemic. He claimed the economic impact of shutting down businesses to combat the spread of COVID would be "killing and devastating more lives than COVID ever will." He participated in the "Reopen Pennsylvania" rally outside the state capitol building, where protestors demanded Governor Wolf repeal lockdowns measures.

In 2020, Jones was among 26 Pennsylvania House Republicans who called for the reversal of Joe Biden's certification as the winner of Pennsylvania's electoral votes in the 2020 United States presidential election, citing false claims of election irregularities.

In 2022, Republican leadership removed Jones from three of his four committee assignments after he endorsed Joe D'Orsie and Wendy Fink in their primary challenges against incumbent Representatives Keith Gillespie and Stan Saylor, respectively. Jones said his decision to endorse the two challengers wasn't personal but "business" because Gillespie and Saylor didn't oppose COVID shutdowns. In response to his support for D'Orsie and Fink, the York County Republican Committee attempted to censure Jones. The censure vote reportedly failed, according to Jones. Both D'Orsie and Fink were successful in defeating in the incumbent representatives.

Jones became a founding member of the Pennsylvania State Freedom Caucus in late 2022, alongside twenty-two other Republicans in the State House.

Personal life
Jones married his wife Julie (née Anderson) in 1992. The couple have four adoptive children from Russia.

Electoral history

|-
! style="background-color: #800080; width: 8px;" |
| style="width: 130px" | Democratic/Republican
|               | Michael Jones
| align="right" | 1,697
| align="right" | 98.95
|-

References

External links
Official Web Site

Republican Party members of the Pennsylvania House of Representatives
21st-century American politicians
Year of birth missing (living people)
Living people
People from York County, Pennsylvania
DeVry University alumni
School board members in Pennsylvania